Mangalore Gopal Kini (1893–1952), better known as M. G. Kini M.C., M.B., M.Ch., F.R.C.S., was an Indian Orthopedic Surgeon.

He was considered by the Indian Orthopedic surgical community as the forerunner of Orthopedic Surgery in India.  The "Kini Memorial Oration" has been held by the Indian Orthopaedic Association (IOA) every year since 1958.

Publications

References

Further reading

Indian orthopedic surgeons
1893 births
1952 deaths
20th-century Indian medical doctors
20th-century surgeons